The EHF Women's Champions League 2008/09 was the 16th edition of the EHF Women's Champions League, a handball competition for top women's clubs of Europe managed by the European Handball Federation. It was won by Danish club Viborg HK who defeated Hungarian Győri Audi ETO KC at the finals with an aggregate score of 50–49. It was the second title for Viborg and the fifth for a Danish team.

German international Grit Jurack was the tournament's top scorer with 113 goals.

Qualification Tournament 1

Group A

Group B

Qualification Tournament 2

Group 1

Group 2

Group 3

Group 4

Group Matches 
Top 2 teams from each group advance to the Main Round, while the third placed team from each group will compete in the Cup Winners' Cup.

Teams

Legend

Group A

Group B

Group C

Group D

Main Round 

The draw for the Main Round took place on 20 January 2009.

After the draw, the following groups were formed:

Group 1

Group 2

Final round 
The semi-finals and finals are played in two legs of home and away matches. Viborg and Győr had home court advantage for the second leg of the semifinals as winners of their respective groups. Also, there was no need to perform a draw to decide home and away rights for the finals. According to EHF regulations, Viborg would get home court for the first match because they played a final in the last three years (2005/06).

Semifinals 
First leg

Second leg

Finals

Top scorers 
As published by the EHF

References

External links 

 
Women's EHF Champions League
EHF
EHF